

Koolywurtie is a locality in the Australian state of South Australia located on the Yorke Peninsula about  west of the state capital of Adelaide and about  south  of the municipal seat  of Maitland.

Koolywurtie's boundaries were created on 27 May 1999  and given the “local established name” which is derived from the local aboriginal word used for some "nearby native wells."

The 2021 Australian census which was conducted in August 2021 reports that Koolywurtie had a population of 101 people. 

Koolywurtie is located within the federal division of Grey, the state electoral district of Narungga and the local government area of the Yorke Peninsula Council.

References

 

Towns in South Australia
Yorke Peninsula